Super heavyweight is a weight class in combat sports and competitive bodybuilding.

Boxing
In amateur boxing, the super heavyweight division is a weight class division for fighters weighing in excess of 91 kilograms (200 pounds). Introduced for the 1984 Summer Olympics, the division is the amateur equivalent of the heavyweight division in professional boxing. The super heavyweight division was introduced because the general increase in the weight of top heavyweights throughout the 20th century meant that the heavyweight division became excessively broad, with the smaller men having little chance of competing effectively. Therefore, the bigger men were split off into the new super heavyweight division. Professional boxing also made this split, but instead of renaming the unlimited division, it introduced the cruiserweight division for the smaller heavyweights, and continued to call the unlimited division heavyweight. In the International Kickboxing Federation (IKF), the Super Heavyweight class (pro and amateur) is for kickboxers weighing  and above.

Olympic champions
 1984 –  
 1988 –  
 1992 –  
 1996 –  
 2000 –  
 2004 –  
 2008 – 
 2012 – 
 2016 – 
 2020 –

Mixed martial arts

The super heavyweight division in MMA generally refers to competitors weighing more than 265lb (120 kg), as up to 265 a competitor is considered to be part of the heavyweight division. In modern MMA, no current major organisation has introduced an actual super heavyweight division. The WEC was the only major promotion to possess a Super Heavyweight championship(2005-2006). The WEC Super Heavyweight division was abolished December 2006 when Zuffa purchased the organization.

Professional wrestling
Although not generally used as a formal weight division in professional wrestling, the term "super heavyweight" is frequently used informally to refer to outsized wrestlers, typically with large obese physiques.

References

Boxing weight classes 
Wrestling weight classes